Ethera is the fifth full-length album by Austrian symphonic power metal band Visions of Atlantis. It was released on 25 March 2013. It is the last album to feature Mario Plank on male vocals, Maxi Nil on female vocals, Christian Hermsdörfer on guitars and Martin Harb on keyboards.

Reception 
The album received generally positive reviews. Metalstorm.net gave the album a 7 out of 10, stating: "They really push the line here between symphonic metal and straight up heavy metal, the riffs and rhythms are really paramount. High-energy rockers plus some slightly cheesy ballads make for a really nice flow here. It's a classic formula with fun, catchy melodies." Metal-Temple.com gave the album an 8 out of 10, stating: "Ethera finds Visions Of Atlantis at their best. What began on their last record has been solidified and perfected here. Front to back this is the best release of their career". metaldivas.wordpress.com gave it 6.5 points out of 10, stating: " In overall, an interesting and pleasant album with some great moments and good vocal lines but somehow it misses its target having little to no variety".

Track listing

Personnel 

Band members
Maxi Nil – vocals
Mario Plank – vocals
Christian Hermsdörfer – guitars
Thomas Caser – drums
Martin Harb - keys

Guest musicians
Fabio D'amore (Serenity) – bass and additional vocals
Roland Navratil (ex-Edenbridge) – drums
Simone D'Eusanio – additional violin on "Bestiality Vs. Integrity", additional vocals on "Burden of Infinity"

Production
Christian Hermsdörfer – producer
Fabio D'amore – engineer
Frank Pitters – engineer
Ivan Moni Bidin – engineer
Jacob Grabmayr – mixing
Mika Jussila – mastering
Martin Harb – cover concept
Thomas Caser – cover concept
Vance Kelly – cover artwork & cover concept

References 

2013 albums
Visions of Atlantis albums
Napalm Records albums